Fontana Lake is a reservoir impounded by Fontana Dam on the Little Tennessee River, and is located in Graham and Swain counties in North Carolina. The lake forms part of the southern border of Great Smoky Mountains National Park and the northern border of part of the Nantahala National Forest. The eastern end is the Tuckasegee River near Bryson City. The lake has many inlets into coves and many islands formed from former mountain peaks, especially near the eastern end. As with most dam-impounded lakes, the steep banks are exposed when water levels are low. Many towns were submerged shortly after the creation of Fontana Lake, such as Proctor and Judson.

Fontana Lake provides the only access into the most remote areas of the National Park, unless visitors undertake a multi-day hike to get there. When the lake is at the normal summer level, a boat may be used to access remote trailheads such as Hazel Creek. From the observation tower on Clingmans Dome, on a clear day the lake can be seen nearly a mile below. NC 28 roughly parallels the southern shore of the lake, and US 19, between Bryson City and Wesser/Lauada, briefly skims an inlet at the extreme southeastern edge.


Name
Fontana is named after a Montvale Lumber Company logging town that was once situated at the mouth of Eagle Creek on the lake's north shore.  The name is derived from the Italian word for "fountain".

See also
 Hazel Creek (Great Smoky Mountains)

References

External links

Description at NorthCarolinaVacation.com

Little Tennessee River
Fontana
Protected areas of Swain County, North Carolina
Protected areas of Graham County, North Carolina
Great Smoky Mountains National Park
Nantahala National Forest
Bodies of water of Swain County, North Carolina
Bodies of water of Graham County, North Carolina